The Steelmark is a logo representing steel and the steel industry owned by the American Iron and Steel Institute, and used by it to promote the product and its manufacturers.

The logo was incorporated as the emblem of the Pittsburgh Steelers and Huachipato, the first initially using the same design as the Steelmark, but later modified to include the team's full name.

Description

The Steelmark consists of three four-pointed starlike figures within a circle. The stars in the design approximate a type of geometric figure called an astroid, a particular type of hypocycloid with four cusps. The original figures were most likely constructed with the help of French curves and a bit of artistic license, as the logo was designed decades before computer-aided graphics came into common use.  The actual figures are somewhat more concave than mathematically true astroids. A yellow figure is located at the top of the design, orange to the right and blue on the bottom, with the word "Steel" on the left side. The logo appears within a gray ring against a white background.

History
The Steelmark logo was unveiled in January 1960, with AISI president Benjamin F. Fairless proclaiming that the campaign marked "the first time that steel has been merchandised industry-wide at the consumer level".  Fairless predicted that the program would help American steel makers fend off demand for imports.

Individual steel makers could use the design to promote the steel in finished products, and to help create a competitive awareness of the strength and quality of steel against aluminum and plastics. In 1964, the steel industry distributed 21 million of the Steelmark decals to be affixed to appliances and other household products.

In the original 1960 announcement of the program, the three hypocycloids were said to represent "the modernity, lightness and stylishness" of consumer products made of American steel. Later interpretations were that the Steelmark  highlighted the attributes of steel, with yellow representing "lightens your work", the orange denoting "brightens your leisure" and the blue meaning that steel "widens your world". The definition of the logo components was updated to represent the three materials used to produce steel, with yellow for coal, orange for iron ore and blue for scrap steel.

Pittsburgh Steelers

Co-owner of the Steelmark logo, Cleveland-based Republic Steel approached the owners of the Pittsburgh Steelers about placing the logo on their helmets for the 1962 NFL season, figuring that it would be a perfect product placement for the steel manufacturers. The equipment manager for the team was told to put the logo on the right side of the team's all-gold helmets. The Steelers went 9–5 that season, their best record to that date. For their first post-season game, in the 1962 Playoff Bowl, the team changed the helmet color from gold to black to make it stand out more and it has remained largely unchanged since, with the team being the only one in the National Football League to have a logo on only one side of the helmet. In 1963, the Steelers petitioned the American Iron and Steel Institute to be allowed to change the word "Steel" in the logo to the full team name, which was approved by the AISI.

Club Deportivo Huachipato 
The Chilean soccer club Huachipato has a mirror image of the Steelmark logo as part of its shield. Their nickname is "Los Acereros", which is Spanish for "the Steelers." The club originated from the local steel manufacturer (Compañia de Aceros del Pacífico, CAP). The logo was designed as an homage to the origins of the club as a team representing the steel workers of the factory.

Notes 

Commercial logos
Steel industry of the United States
Trademarks
American logos
Symbols introduced in 1960
Pittsburgh Steelers